Margaret Henderson (née Watson) (27 May 1921 – 13 February 2007) was a Scottish dancer who made a significant contribution to Scottish country dancing between 1963 and 2007.

Family and background 

Born in Edinburgh on 27 May 1921 to Alexander and Charlotte Watson, Margaret Watson was the youngest of five children. She chose to join the army rather than stay at home as a 'land girl'. Though she gained several promotions, she frequently got into trouble and earned her several demotions.

Based in Europe during World War II, she once missed her return flight from a weekend's leave. She was forced to return by a convoluted route, arriving back at base seven days late, by which time the plane she had originally been intended to take had been shot down, and she had been presumed dead by her comrades.

She married George Henderson in St. Mary's Cathedral, Palmerston Place, Edinburgh on 9 August 1947, and shortly after they moved to London, living initially in Barnet. Henderson gave birth to two children, Robin (born 1950) and Pamela (born 1957). In due time she became a grandmother to Lorna (born 1974), Michael (born 1976), and Elizabeth (born 1981).

Scottish country dancing 

Margaret excelled at Scottish country dancing, and invented many dances that subsequently won prizes. No-one she entered for a medal ever failed. She qualified as a dancing teacher in 1963, and by 1967 she was already attracting local attention, meriting a full page article as personality of the month in the Middlesex Chronicle under the headline of "She keeps the Scots dancing".

Her influence on the style of Scottish country dancing was dramatic. She paid great attention to the basics such as correct footwork, timing, posture and the like. Prior to her involvement, competition dance sets had become rather narrow, squashed and cramped, based on the conditions in a crowded ceilidh. Henderson tried to make the best use of the space available for her sets and deliberately left a large space between the opposing lines, creating a square set with plenty of room to dance. This approach brought her success in local dance competitions and examinations. Her style caught on with other dance groups and became commonplace.

Margaret wrote many dances but chose only to publish the better ones such as: The Changing of the Guard; Donald MacNeil; Doon the Watter; Kith and Kin; The Longhope Strathspey; River Orchey; Sandy Watson; Scotch on the Rocks; The Travelling Tinker; Welcome to Feltham;. In 1973 and 1979 she won the Jack McConachie Memorial Sword Competition, an annual competition for the composition of Scottish country dances, run by the ISTD (Imperial Society of Teachers of Dancing). The winner in 1973 was The Brig O' Bogendreep and in 1979 was Crystal Jig.

Retirement 

Margaret retired from paid employment as a dancing teacher at the age of 60, but continued teaching as a hobby, enjoying many happy years with The Feltham and District Scottish Association.

She died on Tuesday 13 February 2007, a few days after suffering a huge stroke. Her funeral took place at Hanworth Crematorium two weeks later; her ashes were scattered in the grounds of Hanworth Crematorium at the same spot as those of her late husband, George.

References

1921 births
2007 deaths
Folk dancers
Scottish female dancers